Tullow RFC is an Irish Rugby team based in Tullow, Leinster, playing in Division 1B of the Leinster League.

History
The club was founded in 1928, but closed after around 30 years. It was re-established in 1971. The first president in the club was Larry Kenny. Some of the same families involved in 1928 are still actively involved.

Facilities 
The club house, which extends to 4,500 sq. ft. includes bar facilities, a large ballroom, kitchen facilities, 4 large changing rooms with showers, physiotherapy room, weights gym, 2 full sized playing fields and training areas. The pitches and training area have state of the art floodlights as well as two dugouts and a supporters stand on the main field.

Notable players
Ireland and Leinster hooker Bernard Jackman started his senior career with the club and later coached the team as well, before moving on to Division Two outfit Coolmine

Honours
 Leinster Towns Cup: 2016-17

References

 Tullow RFC

Irish rugby union teams
Rugby union clubs in County Carlow
Rugby clubs established in 1928